Atrochidae is a family of rotifers belonging to the order Collothecaceae.

Genera:
 Acyclus Leidy, 1882
 Atrochus Wierzejski, 1893
 Cupelopagis Forbes, 1882

References

Collothecaceae
Rotifer families